Collins O. Airhihenbuwa is a Beninese public health researcher. He is Director of the Global Research Against Non-communicable Disease (GRAND) Initiative and Professor of Health Management & Policy at Georgia State University.

Early life and education 
Airhihenbuwa was born in Benin. His parents were both farmers. He started his academic career in business studies at Tennessee State University, before switching to healthcare and eventually working toward a bachelor's degree in health planning. He earned a certificate in health administration at Meharry Medical College. He moved to the University of Tennessee for his graduate research, where he earned a Master of Public Health in 1981 and a PhD in 1983. It was during his doctoral research that he realised how culture and inequality impacted health.

Research and career 
From the start of the 1980s Airhihenbuwa was involved with the public health response to the HIV/AIDS epidemic. He joined Pennsylvania State University in 1984 where he worked as Professor of Health Education and Dean for Minority Affairs.  Airhihenbuwa spent his sabbatical at the World Health Organization, where he worked in Switzerland, Malawi and Nigeria. In 2000 he was promoted to Professor of Health Education. From 2006 to 2015 Airhihenbuwa served as Head of the Department of Biobehavioral Health. In 2016 he joined Saint Louis University as Dean of the College for Public Health and Social Justice. He moved to Georgia State University as a Professor of Health Management & Policy in 2019. At Georgia State University he joined a commission that looked to improve diversity of the faculty.

His research considers the health of marginalised populations in the United States, with a particular focus on hypertension, diabetes and cancer. At Pennsylvania State University, he started to investigate the higher mortality rates of diseases related to diet in African Americans. His research showed that to improve African American health would require both easy access to healthy food and culturally sensitive education. His work makes use of the PEN-3 cultural model, which includes three main approaches (1) Cultural Identity, (2) Relationships and Expectations, and (3) Cultural Empowerment. He incorporates critical race theory to understand how power and racism impact public health. In 2017 Airhihenbuwa founded U-Rise, a consultancy organisation which combines health and social justice. 

He serves on the Executive Board of the University of California, Los Angeles Center for the Study of Racism.

Awards and honours 
1998 American Association of Health Education Scholar of the Year
2006 Pennsylvania State University W. LaMarr Kopp International Achievement Award
2011 Society for Public Health Education Mentor Award

Selected publications

References 

Living people
Year of birth missing (living people)
People from Benin City
University of Tennessee alumni
Tennessee State University alumni
Public health researchers